Callichilia monopodialis is a plant in the dogbane family Apocynaceae.

Description
It has white flowers.

Distribution and habitat
Callichilia monopodialis is endemic to Cameroon.

Conservation
Callichilia monopodialis has been assessed as Vulnerable on the IUCN Red List. The species is broadly threatened by slash-and-burn agriculture and by urban expansion near Yaoundé.

References

monopodialis
Endemic flora of Cameroon
Plants described in 1896